Kuala Langat Municipal Council is the municipal council which administers Kuala Langat District. This agency is under the purview of Selangor state government.

History
Established on January 1, 1977, under the Local Government Act 1976 by a combination of 3 Local Councils: Sg. Jarom, Tanjung Sepat Local Council, Kuala Langat Municipal Board.

Early establishment 3.7 square miles (9.6 km), 2001 increased to 62,294 km2 and 2006 increased to 857.70 km2 including 3 nautical miles.

Administration
As 16th Dec 2021:
President: Amirul Azizan Abd Rahim
Secretary Of President: Nor Asiah Mohd Salleh
Vice President & Head Of Development Planning Department: Arpaaii Sanat
Secretary Of Vice President: Nurul Asimah Suriyani
Head Of Management Services Department: Fauzi Din
Head Of Treasury Department: Kamarulzaman Ahmad
Head Of Engineering Department: Zulkefli Mohamed Arif
Head Of Community Development & Corporate Department: Hishamuddin Ismail
Head Of Property Valuation and Management Department: Lisawati Abd Karim
Head Of Building Control Department: Syamsol Herwan Ahmad
Head Of Landscape Department: Mazlan Abdul Manap
Head Of Licensing Department: Nordila Yasir
Head Of Enforcement Department: Hashila Hamzah
Head Of Solid Waste Management and Environmental Health Department: Norain Mohamed
Head Of Local Central Unit (OSC): Nordin Hashim
Head Of Internal Audit Unit: Mohaneswary Batumalai @ Subramaniam
Head Of Building Commissioner Unit (COB): Mohd Shauki Jamaludin
Head Of Procurement and Quantity Surveying Unit & Head Of Legal Unit: Mohammad Kamal Mohd Ramlan
Head Of Information Technology Division: Mohd Firdaus Zainal Abidin

Councilors
2020-2022 Session:

Zones

Zone 1
Taman Bayu Sijangkang
Taman Sijangkang Permai
Taman Desa Sijangkang
Taman Sijangkang Damai
Taman Desa Sijangkang 1
Taman Medan Indah
Taman Medan Jaya
Taman Iram Perdana
Taman Sijangkang Indah
Taman Sijangkang 3
Taman Sijangkang Idaman
Kampung Sijangkang
Kampung Medan

Zone 2
Taman Sijangkang Jaya
Taman Perwira
Taman Sri Medan
Taman Desawira
Taman Bentara
Kampung Batu 9, Kebun Baru
Kawasan Perusahaan Kebun Baru
Taman Industri Sijangkang Utama
Kawasan Perindustrian Telok Panglima Garang

Zone 3
Bandar Rimbayu
Bandar Tropicana Aman
Eco Sanctuary

Zone 4
Taman Indah Jaya
Taman Aman
Taman Halijahton
Taman Dato' Hormat
Kampung Telok Panglima Garang
Kawasan Perusahaan Telok Mengkuang 
Telok Panglima Garang Free Trade Zone

Zone 5
Taman Srikandi
Taman Satria
Taman Nakhoda
Taman Sejahtera
Taman Rambai Indah
Taman Kota
Taman Makumur
Taman Pahlawan
Kampung Batu 10, Kebun Baru
Kampung Sungai Rambai
Kawasan Perindustrian Jenjarom

Zone 6
Taman Ria
Taman Seri Jaromas
Taman Jenjarom Permai
Taman Amanah
Taman Setia
Kampung Jenjarom
Kampung Orang Asli Bukit Kechil
Tanjung Rabok
Bukit Gagak
Kawasan Perusahaan Batu 15, Jenjarom

Zone 7
Bandar Saujana Putra
Taman Desa Kemandol
Gamuda Kemuning
Kampung Jaya Sepakat
Kampung Orang Asli Desa Kemandol
BSP Sky Park

Zone 8
Taman Pertiwi
Taman Perkasa
Taman Telok
Taman Jaya Utama
Taman Panglima
Kawasan Perusahaan Batu 12, Sungai Rambai
Kawasan Perusahaan Segenting

Zone 9
Taman Seri Rambai
Taman Desa Jarom
Taman Seri Jarom
Taman Melati
Taman Yayasan
Taman Galing
Taman Gembira
Taman Bestari
Kampung Baru Sungai Jarom
Kampung Sungai Jarom
Kawasan Perusahaan Ringan Jenjarom
Kawasan Perusahaan Ringan Taman Yayasan

Zone 10
Taman Sentosa
Taman Seri Cheeding
Kampung Seri Cheeding 
Taman Perindustrian Sungai Sedu
Kawasan Perusahaan Seri Cheeding

Zone 11
Paya Indah Wetland
Taman Mas Langat
Peatland Paradise
Kampung Orang Asli Busut Baru
Kampung Orang Asli Bukit Cheeding
Kampung Orang Asli Pulau Kempas
Bandar Gamuda Cove
Taman Perindustrian Putra

Zone 12
Taman Changgang Jaya
Taman D'Menara
Taman Langat Murni
Taman Langat Utama 1,2,3,4,5
Taman Seri Changgang 1,2,3
Taman Seri Dagang 1
Taman Seri Maju
Kampung Bukit Changgang
RTB Bukit Changgang 
Kampung Orang Asli Bukit Serdang
Kawasan Perusahaan Olak Lempit 
Taman Industri Langat Utama

Zone 13
Taman Merbah
Taman Bajuri
Taman Nuri Indah
Taman Desa Idaman
Taman Cenderawasih
Taman Merpati
Bandar Mahkota Banting
Kampung Olak Lempit
Kampung Orang Asli Mutus Tua
Kompleks Perabot Olak Lempit
Kawasan Perusahaan Mega Steel

Zone 14
Taman Seri
Bandar Sungai Emas
Taman Langat Jaya
Taman Seri Manggis
Taman Manggis Jaya
Kota Seri Langat
Taman Bakti
Taman Periang
Taman Langat Indah
Kampung Sungai Manggis
Kampung Orang Asli Bukit Perah
Kawasan Perusahaan Bandar Mahkota Banting 
Kawasan Perusahaan Bandar Sungai Emas

Zone 15
Taman Seri Bunut
Taman Banting Mewah
Taman Mulia
Taman Muhibbah
Taman Sari
Taman Delima
Taman Seri Pelangi
Taman Nilam
Kampung Banting
Kampung Orang Asli Pulau Banting
Kawasan Perusahaan Ringan (Taman Muhibbah Banting)

Zone 16
Taman Seri Sawah
Taman Jugra Jaya
Taman Desa Permatang Jaya
Taman Banting Baru
Taman Jugra Indah
Taman Chodoi Bestari
Taman Permai
Kampung Bandar
Kampung Sungai Buaya
Kampung Permatang Pasir
Kampung Sawah
Kampung Seri Jugra

Zone 17
Kampung Melayu Pulau Carey
Kampung Orang Asli Sungai Kurau
Kampung Orang Asli Sungai Judah
Kampung Orang Asli Sungai Rambai
Kampung Orang Asli Kepau Laut
Kampung Sungai Bumbun
Sime Darby Biodiesel Sdn Bhd
Sime Darby Plantation Academy
Amverton Cove Golf & Island Resort

Zone 18
Taman Damai Indah
Taman Seri Bayu
Taman Seri Desa
Taman Seri Muhibbah, Kelanang
Taman Sepakat
Taman Seri Kelanang
Taman Cemara
Taman Harmoni
Taman Bayu Indah
Taman Bahagia
Kampung Tali Air
Kampung Morib
Kampung Kelanang
KOA Permatang Buah
KOA Telok Tongkah
Hotel Impian Morib
El Azhar Camp
Bandar Peranginan Seri Morib

Zone 19
Taman Kemuning
Taman Budiman
Taman Cempaka
Taman Beringin
Taman Aman
Taman Gembira
Taman Baiduri
Taman Setia Jaya
Taman Banting Jaya
Taman Seri Putra
Taman Seri Banting
Kawasan Perusahaan Banting
Pusat Perniagaan Suasa
Pasar Banting

Zone 20
Taman Desa Jaya
Taman Bersatu
Taman Teratai
Taman Mawar
Kampung Sungai Lang Baru
Kampung Sungai Lang Tengah
Kampung Sungai Kelambu

Zone 21
Bandar Seri Ehsan
Taman Seri Dagang 2
Taman Seri Dagang 3
Kampung Labohan Dagang
Kampung Orang Asli Bukit Tadom
Kampung Orang Asli Paya Rumput 
Kawasan Perusahaan Genting Sanyen

Zone 22
Taman Mesra
Taman Seri Damai
Taman Kenanga
Taman Orkid
Taman Damai
Kampung Kanchong Tengah
Kampung Kanchong Darat
Kampung Endah
Gold Coast Morib Resort

Zone 23
Taman Seri Kundang
Kampung Ladang Batu
Kampung Batu Laut
Kampung Kundang

Zone 24
Taman Pelangi
Taman Tanjung
Taman Seri Tanjung
Taman Mutiara
Kampung Baru Tanjung Sepat
Kampung Tanjung Sepat Darat
Kampung Tumbuk Darat/Tumbuk Pantai
Kampung Orang Asli Tanjung Sepat
Kawasan Perusahaan Tanjung Sepat

Areas That Under Orang Besar's Responsibility
Istana Jugra
Istana Bandar
Masjid Bandar
Istana Morib
Tomb Of Sultan Abdul Samad

Branch
Bandar Saujana Putra 
Head: Wan Putara Noor Shahan Ngadirin

Legislation
Acts
13 June 1974: Act 133, Roads, Drains and Buildings Act 1974
25 March 1976: Act 171, Local Government Act 1976
25 March 1976: Act 172, Town and Country Planning Act 1976
14 April 2007: Act 663, Building & Common Property (Maintenance & Operators) Act

References

Local government in Selangor
Municipal councils in Malaysia